StarKid Productions, also known as Team StarKid,  is an American musical theatre company founded in 2009 at the University of Michigan by Darren Criss, Brian Holden, Matt Lang, and Nick Lang. Originally known for the viral success of their first musical, A Very Potter Musical, a parody of the Harry Potter series, the troupe primarily produces musical comedies inspired by pop culture, with original scripts, songs, and music. StarKid distributes their musicals for free on YouTube, with recent projects being funded by Kickstarter and physical ticket sales.

Since the success of A Very Potter Musical, the group has produced thirteen stage musicals (including two Potter sequels), three national tours, two reunion concert specials, three sketch comedy shows, and three web series.

As of 2020, the company has charted 12 albums on the Billboard charts. The cast recording of Me and My Dick debuted at number 11 on the US Cast Albums chart in 2010, becoming the first student-produced musical recording to chart on Billboard. The following year they landed at number one on the same chart with the cast recording of Starship, a feat that has since been repeated with their 2019 musical Black Friday.

History 
StarKid Productions is composed of actors, writers, directors, composers, choreographers, and designers, most of them originating from the University of Michigan's School of Music, Theater and Dance. The members met while collaborating on plays through Basement Arts, the university's student-run theater organization.

In April 2009, the students staged a musical parody of the Harry Potter series entitled A Very Potter Musical. The video of the play went viral on the Internet, garnering StarKid a worldwide fanbase. Inspired by the viral nature of the video, StarKid Productions was formed, named after a quote from A Very Potter Musical. Later, two sequels were performed and released on YouTube, A Very Potter Sequel in 2010 and A Very Potter Senior Year in 2012.

The Team StarKid YouTube channel was established on June 19, 2009. As of January 2023, the channel has over 760,000 subscribers and over 324,000,000 combined views. Aside from the viral Harry Potter adaptions, Team StarKid have produced a number of other musical theatre parody shows, creating both original stories and pop culture-based parodies of Disney, DC Comics, Star Wars, and The Oregon Trail.

Team Starkid has had two major moves since its founding in 2009. The first was to Chicago after the founders graduated from The University of Michigan. Several shows were performed in Chicago before most of the company's members moved once again, this time to Los Angeles.

 Musical theatre productions 

Team StarKid produced a sequel to their 2011 musical Starship called Starship: Requiem that was performed on August 2, 2014 at LeakyCon in Orlando, FL. However, it was a one-time "theatrical reading" and, as such, Team StarKid does not include it in their musical canon. The story followed the adventures of the android Mega-Girl and her half-witted Starship Ranger husband, Tootsie Noodles, as the newlyweds go to visit Mega-Girl's human-hating family.

 Concerts and tours The SPACE Tour (2011) — North American concert tour with 21 stops in 15 cities. "SPACE" in the tour title stands for StarKid Precarious Auditory Concert Experience.Apocalyptour (2012) —  North American concert tour with 24 stops in 21 cities. The tour title is a reference to the 2012 phenomenon.A Very StarKid Reunion (2015) — Reunion concert performed in celebration of the 100th anniversary of the University of Michigan School of Music, Theater, and Dance.StarKid Homecoming (2019) — Reunion concert held at the Theater at the Ace on July 25–26, 2019.The Jangle Ball Tour (2022) — North American concert tour with 8 stops in 7 cities from December 2 to December 17, 2022.

 Sketch comedy productions Airport for Birds: January–March 2013, Chicago, IL. StarKid Productions teamed up with The Second City to produce their first sketch comedy show. The show was produced at the UP Comedy Club.1Night 2Last 3Ever: September–November 2013, Chicago, IL. StarKid Productions second sketch comedy show with The Second City. The show was produced at the UP Comedy Club. The show was a parody of various pieces of 1990s pop culture centering on the exploits of a fictional boy band, 3Ever.Yes, I am Afraid of the Dark!: September–October 2015, Chicago, IL. StarKid Productions first improv comedy show with iO Chicago and was produced at the iO Theater. The show was a parody of the 1990s children show Are You Afraid of the Dark? with the cast creating an entire episode based on audience suggestion.

Web series
Little White Lie
In 2007, members including Matt Lang, Nick Lang, Eric Kahn Gale, Brian Holden, Darren Criss, Lauren Lopez, Elona Finlay, Chris Allen, Meredith Stepien, and Jim Povolo produced an online video series called Little White Lie. It was released in 2009 on StarKid's YouTube channel. Despite the series ending in a cliffhanger, StarKid members have confirmed at various events that there will be no season 2, as it was an expensive production and the actors who took part in it are scattered all over the country. However, Eric Kahn Gale, one of the writers for the show, stated that he would write and publish a synopsis of season 2, which was released on September 3, 2013 on his Tumblr page.

Movies, Musicals, and Me
In October 2017, StarKid debuted its second web series on YouTube, Movies, Musicals, and Me. The series takes place in an alternate world where every popular movie ever has been adapted into a Broadway musical. The best of these musicals all star the same man, Halpert Evans, a vain and pompous, though brilliant, actor. The series is structured as a mocumentary of Evans, chronicling the most significant musical roles of his career, along with commentary from various colleagues in Halpert's line of work. The series introduces StarKid newcomers Esther Fallick as Halpert Evans and Mary Kate Wiles as Judy Davendale. Joey Richter, Nick Lang, Brian Holden, Dylan Saunders, Lauren Lopez, Jaime Lyn Beatty, Corey Dorris, and Clark Baxtresser also star.

 Nightmare Time 
On October 1, 2020, StarKid announced a new three-episode horror anthology series set in the world of The Guy Who Didn't Like Musicals and Black Friday. It featured six stories read by the cast of the shows. Performances took place virtually on October 10, 17, and 24, 2020. In August 2021 a second season was announced. A cast recording was released on February 8, 2021.

The next year, StarKid later livestreamed Nightmare Time 2'', the second season of the series.  Four performances took place virtually on October 23 & 30 and November 6 & 13, 2021. The entire cast from the first season returned with the exceptions of Robert Manion & Kendall Nicole Yakshe.  The series was also the StarKid debut of Bryce Charles and Jae Hughes. The episodes were released weekly on StarKid's YouTube channel between May 20, 2022 and June 10, 2022.

Soundtrack albums

Notes

References

External links 
 

 
Musical theatre companies
Theatre companies in Chicago
Organizations established in 2009
2009 establishments in Michigan
University of Michigan